A painter and traveller, Georges Ricard-Cordingley (1873-1939) constantly searched for an original contact with the world of sea.

Biography 

 1873 - January 30 : Georges Ricard born in Lyon, to parents Prosper Louis Ricard and Georgina Marie Cordingley.  Childhood spent chiefly in Lyon and Boulogne-sur-Mer; quickly displays a gift for drawing.
 1875,  Death of his father.
 1887,  Becomes student of Jean-Charles Cazin (1840-1901), landscape artist in Pas-de-Calais.
 1888-1889, Attends School of Fine Arts, Lyon
 1890, Enrolls in Académie Julian, Paris; studies under Jean-Joseph Benjamin-Constant, Louis Martinet, and Jules Lefèvre.
 1892, Death of his mother; Georges is 19.  Stays with mother’s relatives during trip to England, adopts the surname Cordingley.  
First voyage to the North Sea with the Fishermen's Mission.  First studies for seascapes.

 1894, Paintings very well received in Queen Victoria’s court.
 1895, Second trip to North Sea.  Produces studies of waves, clouds.  Also paints myriad fishermen’s portraits, portscapes.  
Works exhibited in Paris and London.

 1896, Third voyage to North Sea; continues across Atlantic with a French mission to seafarers.  Shipwreck in Newfoundland.
 1901, Establishes studio in Boulogne-sur-Mer.
Divides time between London, Paris, and Boulogne.  Paints portraits and seascapes.

 1903, Responsible for ornamentation of Wimereux Casino (Pas-de-Calais).
 1909-1910, Voyage and exhibitions in Australia.
 1911, Marries Suzanne Giraud-Teulon, later the mother of his three children: 
Éliane (1913-1945), Louis (1917-1942) and Gabrielle (born 1924).

 1914-1918, Assigned to work as ambulance attendant in Lyon.  Continues drawing.
 1918,  Moves to Villa des Enfants in Cannes; buys Villa René on Boulevard Sainte-Beuve in Boulogne-sur-Mer.
 1924-1928, Buys a house in Neuilly-sur-Seine. 
Divides time between the Parisian suburb, Cannes and Boulogne. Takes many trips Normandy, Brittany, the Mediterranean, North Africa. Exhibits work in and around Paris, Cannes, and Boulogne. 
Also travels to lake regions in Switzerland, Italy and France.

 1928-1930, Trips to the Netherlands, Basque Country, North Sea.
 1931-1934, Trips to North Africa, notably to Morocco, where he exhibited work in 1934.  
Winters in Cannes, summers in Boulogne-sur-Mer.

 1935, Continues to paint in Cannes. Travels to Spain and Portugal.
 1936, Moves to Mougins, then to Cannet, to be near the sea.
 1939 - April 25: death in Cannes following a cerebral hemorrhage.

Work 

Georges Ricard-Cordingley is the only maritime artist to have begun life in Lyon.  His taste for the esoteric, his writings about art, and his treatment of mist in seascapes—nuanced tones, subtle harmonies—make him a clear product of the Lyonnais school of painting.  Here was a man remarkable for his discretion, finesse, and restraint in conveying feelings and emotions.  Ricard-Cordingley was said to be a painter of colourful greys: hues echoed not only in the styles of the Lyonnais and London schools, but in the two cities themselves, which granted the artist his first taste of success.  He would also find a niche in Boulogne-sur-Mer and Cannes.  In Cordingley’s mind, the morning fog on the North Sea was linked to the evening fog on the Côte d’Azur, and his work basks in the uncertain, infinite nature that this artistic “bilingualism” so effortlessly translates into universal emotion. Different—but above all, diverse—Cordingley’s oils, watercolours and charcoals are marked by a unique artistic vision that unites them all.

From Pierre Miquel (1921-2002) art historian, Cordingley expert

References

Sources

Cristina Baron, Georges Ricard-Cordingley, Paris, musée national de la Marine, 2006, 

1873 births
1939 deaths
19th-century French painters
French male painters
20th-century French painters
20th-century French male artists
Artists from Lyon
19th-century French male artists